Boreonectes is a genus of predaceous diving beetles in the family Dytiscidae. There are about 16 described species in Boreonectes. They are found in North America, the Neotropics, and the Palearctic.

Species
These 16 species belong to the genus Boreonectes:

 Boreonectes aequinoctialis (H.Clark, 1862)
 Boreonectes alpestris (Dutton & Angus, 2007)
 Boreonectes coelamboides (Fall, 1923)
 Boreonectes dolerosus (Leech, 1945)
 Boreonectes emmerichi (Falkenström, 1936)
 Boreonectes expositus (Fall, 1923)
 Boreonectes funereus (Crotch, 1873)
 Boreonectes griseostriatus (De Geer, 1774)
 Boreonectes ibericus (Dutton & Angus, 2007)
 Boreonectes inexpectatus (Dutton & Angus, 2007)
 Boreonectes macedonicus (Guéorguiev, 1959)
 Boreonectes multilineatus (Falkenström, 1922)
 Boreonectes panaminti (Fall, 1923)
 Boreonectes riberae (Dutton & Angus, 2007)
 Boreonectes spenceri
 Boreonectes striatellus (LeConte, 1852)

References

Further reading

 
 
 

Dytiscidae